Melanotus punctosus, is a species of click beetle found in India, Sri Lanka, Pakistan, and Hawaii.

Description
In adults, the length ranges from 12 to 18 mm and is completely black and glossy, except for the legs and antennae, which have a ferruginous brown color. On the head, it has eyes that are slightly narrower than the anterior margin of the pronotum. The pronotum of the beetle is longer than broader and has heterogeneous punctations. In males, the aedeagus has a long median lobe and basally broad parameres.

References 

Elateridae
Insects of Sri Lanka
Beetles described in 1858